In volcanology, a pyroclastic shield or ignimbrite shield is an uncommon type of shield volcano. Unlike most shield volcanoes, pyroclastic shields are formed mostly of pyroclastic and highly explosive eruptions rather than relatively fluid basaltic lava issuing from vents or fissures on the surface of the volcano.
They typically display low-angle flank slopes and often have a central caldera caused by large eruptions. Lava is commonly extruded after explosive activity has ended. The paucity of associated Plinian fall deposits indicates that pyroclastic shields are characterized by low Plinian columns.

Pyroclastic shields are commonly known to form in the Central Andes of South America, as well as in Melanesia (the island of Bougainville alone has two). There are also pyroclastic shields in Africa, such as Emi Koussi in Chad.

Examples

 Ambrym, Vanuatu
 Apoyeque, Nicaragua
 Masaya, Nicaragua
 Billy Mitchell, Bougainville, Papua New Guinea
 Emi Koussi, Chad
 Laguna Colorada, Bolivia
 Loloru, Bougainville, Papua New Guinea
 Cerro Panizos, Bolivia
 Purico Complex, Chile
 Rabaul Volcano, New Britain, Papua New Guinea
 Sacabaya, Bolivia
 Tata Sabaya, Bolivia

See also

Categories:
Pyroclastic cones

References

External links
Pyroclastic Shield Volcano - John Seach

 
Shield volcanoes
Volcanic landforms
Volcanology